Juan Carlos Payano (born April 12, 1984) is a Dominican professional boxer who held the WBA (Undisputed) and then concurrently the IBO bantamweight titles between 2014 and 2016. As an amateur he won two silver medals at the Pan American Games and a gold medal at the Central American and Caribbean Games.

Amateur career
At the 2003 Pan American Games in Santo Domingo, he lost to Yuriorkis Gamboa in the Flyweight final, winning the silver medal.

He won the gold medal at the 2006 Cartagena games after defeating Cuban Yoandris Salinas.

At the 2007 Pan American Games, he won silver again after losing to McWilliams Arroyo in the final.

He compiled a record of 421 wins and 25 losses.

Olympic Games results 
2004
Defeated  Bato-Munko Vankeev 26–18
Lost to  Jérôme Thomas 10–15

2008
Defeated  Jérôme Thomas 10–6
Lost to  Vincenzo Picardi 4–8

Professional career 
On October 7, 2018, Payano battled Naoya Inoue for the WBA regular bantamweight title, as a part of the World Boxing Super Series quarter-final. Inoue caught Payano with a left jab, right hook combination just 1 minute and 10 seconds into the fight, sending Payano to the canvas for the KO win. This was Payano's first professional career knockout.

In his next fight, Payano bounced back with a unanimous decision win against Damien Vazquez. Payano was in control for most of the fight, winning almost every round on the judges' scorecards, 79-73, 80-71, 80-71.

In his following fight, Payano battled against Luis Nery. Payano was considered the underdog against the undefeated Mexican. Nery had his own way for most of the fight, landing the cleaner shots throughout the fight. In the ninth round, a perfectly placed left hook to the body by Nery send Payano to the canvas. Writhing in pain, Payano was not even able to attempt to beat the count, leading to a ninth-round KO win for Nery.

On September 26, 2020, Payano fought former champion Daniel Roman, who was ranked #3 by the Ring, WBA and WBC, and #4 by the WBO and #6 at super bantamweight at the time. Payano lost the fight via unanimous decision. Despite boxing off his back foot, Payano had a strong start in the fight. However, Roman turned up the pressure in the championship rounds, and was aggressive enough to secure the win.

Professional boxing record 

{|class="wikitable" style="text-align:center"
|-
!
!Result
!Record
!Opponent
!Type
!Round, time
!Date
!Location
!Notes
|-
|28
|Win
|23–5
|style="text-align:left;"|Raymond Tabugon
|RTD
|5 (8), 
|Jul 10, 2021
|style="text-align:left;"|
|
|-
|27
|Win
|22–5
|style="text-align:left;"|Luis de la Rosa
|
|5 (10)
|Aug 14, 2021
|style="text-align:left;"|
|
|-
|26
|Loss
|21–5
|style="text-align:left;"|Gary Antonio Russell
|TD
|6 (10), 
|Dec 19, 2020
|style="text-align:left;"|
|style="text-align:left;"|
|-
|25
|Loss
|21–4
|style="text-align:left;"|Daniel Roman
|UD
|12
|Sep 26, 2020
|style="text-align:left;"|
|
|-
|24
|Loss
|21–3
|style="text-align:left;"|Luis Nery
|KO
|9 (12), 
|Jul 20, 2019
|style="text-align:left;"|
|style="text-align:left;"|
|-
|23
|Win
|21–2
|style="text-align:left;"|Damien Vazquez
|UD
|8
|Mar 9, 2019
|style="text-align:left;"|
|
|-
|22
|Loss
|20–2
|style="text-align:left;"|Naoya Inoue
|KO
|1 (12), 
|Oct 7, 2018
|style="text-align:left;"|
|style="text-align:left;"|
|-
|21
|Win
|20–1
|style="text-align:left;"|Mike Plania
|UD
|10
|Mar 23, 2018
|style="text-align:left;"|
|
|-
|20
|Win
|19–1
|style="text-align:left;"|Alexis Santiago
|UD
|10
|Aug 22, 2017
|style="text-align:left;"|
|
|-
|19
|Win
|18–1
|style="text-align:left;"|Isao Gonzalo Carranza
|TKO
|7 (8), 
|Jan 13, 2017
|style="text-align:left;"|
|
|-
|18
|Loss
|17–1
|style="text-align:left;"|Rau'shee Warren
|
|12
|Jun 18, 2016
|style="text-align:left;"|
|style="text-align:left;"|
|-
|17
|Win
|17–0
|style="text-align:left;"|Rau'shee Warren
|
|12
|Aug 2, 2015
|style="text-align:left;"|
|style="text-align:left;"|
|-
|16
|Win
|16–0
|style="text-align:left;"|Anselmo Moreno
|
|6 (12)
|Sep 26, 2014
|style="text-align:left;"|
|style="text-align:left;"|
|-
|15
|Win
|15–0
|style="text-align:left;"|German Meraz
|UD
|8
|Feb 22, 2014
|style="text-align:left;"|
|
|-
|14
|Win
|14–0
|style="text-align:left;"|Jundy Maraon
|KO
|7 (10), 
|Jun 14, 2013
|style="text-align:left;"|
|
|-
|13
|Win
|13–0
|style="text-align:left;"|Jhon Alberto Molina
|TKO
|2 (10), 
|May 10, 2013
|style="text-align:left;"|
|
|-
|12
|Win
|12–0
|style="text-align:left;"|Jose Luis Araiza
|UD
|10
|Nov 30, 2012
|style="text-align:left;"|
|style="text-align:left;"|
|-
|11
|Win
|11–0
|style="text-align:left;"|Jhon Alberto Molina
|TKO
|9 (10), 
|Jul 21, 2012
|style="text-align:left;"|
|style="text-align:left;"|
|-
|10
|Win
|10–0
|style="text-align:left;"|Luis Maldonado
|UD
|10
|May 18, 2012
|style="text-align:left;"|
|style="text-align:left;"|
|-
|9
|Win
|9–0
|style="text-align:left;"|Jose Silveria
|UD
|10
|Mar 2, 2012
|style="text-align:left;"|
|style="text-align:left;"|
|-
|8
|Win
|8–0
|style="text-align:left;"|Leshaun Blair
|TKO
|1 (6), 
|Dec 3, 2011
|style="text-align:left;"|
|
|-
|7
|Win
|7–0
|style="text-align:left;"|Dinoel Reynoso
|TKO
|2 (6), 
|Sep 5, 2011
|style="text-align:left;"|
|
|-
|6
|Win
|6–0
|style="text-align:left;"|Luis Angel Paneto
|UD
|6
|Apr 23, 2011
|style="text-align:left;"|
|
|-
|5
|Win
|5–0
|style="text-align:left;"|Cristobal Ramos
|
|2 (6), 
|Mar 4, 2011
|style="text-align:left;"|
|
|-
|4
|Win
|4–0
|style="text-align:left;"|Norberto Jimenez
|TKO
|2 (6)
|Oct 9, 2010
|style="text-align:left;"|
|
|-
|3
|Win
|3–0
|style="text-align:left;"|Luis Hinojosa
|UD
|4
|Sep 18, 2010
|style="text-align:left;"|
|
|-
|2
|Win
|2–0
|style="text-align:left;"|Daniel Veras
|
|3 (4)
|Aug 28, 2010
|style="text-align:left;"|
|
|-
|1
|Win
|1–0
|style="text-align:left;"|Aneudy Mesa
|
|4
|Aug 21, 2010
|style="text-align:left;"|
|

References

External links 

Juan Carlos Payano - Profile, News Archive & Current Rankings at Box.Live

1984 births
Living people
Flyweight boxers
People from La Vega Province
Boxers at the 2003 Pan American Games
Boxers at the 2007 Pan American Games
Boxers at the 2004 Summer Olympics
Boxers at the 2008 Summer Olympics
Olympic boxers of the Dominican Republic
Dominican Republic male boxers
Pan American Games silver medalists for the Dominican Republic
Pan American Games medalists in boxing
Central American and Caribbean Games gold medalists for the Dominican Republic
Competitors at the 2006 Central American and Caribbean Games
Central American and Caribbean Games medalists in boxing
Medalists at the 2003 Pan American Games
Medalists at the 2007 Pan American Games
20th-century Dominican Republic people
21st-century Dominican Republic people